Chillicothe is a city on the Illinois River in Peoria County, Illinois, United States. The population was 6,097 at the 2010 census. Chillicothe is just north of the city of Peoria and is part of the Peoria Metropolitan Statistical Area.

Geography 

Chillicothe is located on the Illinois River and on the parallel Iowa Interstate Railroad (IAIS) branch, from Bureau to Peoria, which was formerly the Rock Island Railroad.  Crossing the IAIS and the Illinois River at Chillicothe is the former Santa Fe Railroad, now owned by BNSF Railway.
Almost 4 miles outside of town the BNSF Railway operates one of the most notable civil engineering points on the Chillicothe Subdivision. Edelstein Hill is one of the steepest climbs on the railway system and attracts many railfans to see locomotives pulling intermodal trains up the hill.

The Illinois River runs both north and south connecting Chicago with St. Louis. Barge traffic is occasional as it is an efficient means of transportation for some bulk products. Eight miles to the north is Sparland and three miles to the south is Rome. Peoria is 20 miles to the south.

Chillicothe sits along the Illinois River Valley where gravel and sand from prehistoric river development sits. It is currently being dug up and is sold for construction and roadbeds. In Chillicothe there are relatively large service facilities and connections to the BNSF Railway.

Even though Chillicothe sits along a river valley, forests are very common. Marshall State Refuge sits to the north and Atchison Waterfowl Refuge in Woodford County. The bluffs that surround it are full of hunting spots and locations where deer are common. Duck hunting as well is popular in the waterfront sloughs and swamps to the north.

History 
The name Chillicothe comes from the name of the Chalagawtha sept of the Shawnee nation.

Along with Peoria, Chillicothe grew due to river traffic and quickly became a stop for barge and railroad traffic traveling to and from Chicago and St. Louis.

In the late 1800s, the Atchison, Topeka and Santa Fe Railway was building its mainline from Chicago to Kansas City and selected Chillicothe as its crossing point of the Illinois River. The railroad quickly became an establishment in Chillicothe as a crew change point and a notable stop in Central Illinois. Chillicothe today still remains a key point on the Southern Transcon route between Chicago and Los Angeles with high frequency intermodal freight trains moving through daily.

Chillicothe is the host to The Summer Camp Music Festival, a multi-day music festival created by Jay Goldberg Events & Entertainment that is held annually at Three Sisters Park. As of 2018, this will mark the 18th straight year that event has been held in Chillicothe.

Education 
Chillicothe is served by the Illinois Valley School District 321. Chillicothe is the primary area served by the school district along with the neighboring towns of Rome, Mossville, Edelstein, and a part of the area near Dunlap.

Within the school district, there are three primary schools and two junior highs. South School serves the northern half of the school district (Grades PK-3). Chillicothe Junior High (CJH) serves the northern half of the school district (Grades 4–8) in Chillicothe proper while Mossville Junior High (Grades K-8) serves the southern part of the school district. In the Illinois Elementary School Association (IESA) both schools have made themselves known in multiple sports.

Illinois Valley Central High School (IVC) serves Chillicothe and is the home to the Grey Ghosts. IVCHS like its junior highs has made themselves known in the state in various activities. Most notably, the IVC Marching Grey Ghosts have accumulated 15 state titles since 1990, most recently in 2019. In the IHSA, IVC were 2006 Class A Baseball State Champions, 2006 Boys' Basketball Class A State Runners-up, 2006 Class A Scholastic Bowl State Runnerups, 2008 Class AA Baseball State Runners-up, and most recently placed Third for Class AA Baseball in 2010.

Two private schools serve the Chillicothe area. Calvary Baptist Academy is a small, PK-12 school sponsored by Calvary Baptist Church. St. Edward's is a PK-8 Catholic School sponsored by St. Edward Parish. In 2016, St. Edward was featured in regional news outlets for the "Miracle in Chillicothe" fundraising campaign that collected over $500,000 in one week to complete emergency repairs to the building roof.

Demographics 

As of the census of 2000, there were 5,996 people, 2,429 households, and 1,649 families residing in the city. The racial makeup of the city was 97.4% White, 0.2% African American, 0.2% Native American, 0.2% Asian, <0.1% Pacific Islander, 1.1% from other races, and 0.9% from two or more races. Hispanic or Latino of any race were 3.5% of the population.

There were 2,429 households, out of which 31.0% had children under the age of 18 living with them, 54.5% were married couples living together, 10.1% had a female householder with no husband present, and 32.1% were non-families. 28.0% of all households were made up of individuals, and 13.0% had someone living alone who was 65 years of age or older. The average household size was 2.42 and the average family size was 2.96.

In the city, the population was spread out, with 24.7% under the age of 18, 8.1% from 18 to 24, 27.2% from 25 to 44, 22.6% from 45 to 64, and 17.4% who were 65 years of age or older. The median age was 38 years. For every 100 females, there were 89.6 males. For every 100 females age 18 and over, there were 85.9 males.

The median income for a household in the city was $40,697, and the median income for a family was $50,981. Males had a median income of $42,430 versus $23,295 for females. The per capita income for the city was $22,118. About 5.1% of families and 6.2% of the population were below the poverty line, including 5.5% of those under age 18 and 4.0% of those age 65 or over.

Transportation
Illinois Route 29 runs through Chillicothe north to south and is a strong artery running between I-180 in the north and Peoria to the south.

Since its creation the railroad has connected Chillicothe to the outside world. The Rock Island Railroad (now Iowa Interstate Railroad) serves Chillicothe paralleling the Illinois River. The Rock Island Rockets used to serve Chillicothe connecting Peoria & Chicago. As automobiles became more popular, the service was infrequently used. The last revenue service by the Peoria Rocket was on December 31, 1978.

Chillicothe was once a stop on the Santa Fe's Super Chief (Chicago to Los Angeles) & Texas Chief (Lone Star) (Chicago to Houston) on the section of the run between Chicago and Galesburg. It was also a stop on the Super Chief's successor, the Southwest Limited/Southwest Chief. In 1996, however, following the merger of the Burlington Northern and the Santa Fe railroads to form the BNSF, and a connection put in between the Burlington Northern line from Chicago and the Santa Fe's Chillicothe Subdivision at Cameron, Illinois, the Chief was rerouted to Galesburg over the BNSF's Mendota Subdivision (also used by the California Zephyr) through Naperville, Princeton, and Mendota. The last revenue passenger service was on July 31, 1996.

Places of interest 

 Chillicothe Post Office, WPA mural "Rail Roading" by Arthur Herschel Lidov is on display.
 The former Santa Fe Railroad station in the city, and Edelstein Hill near the city, are popular train watching locations.
 The Chillicothe Historical Society Railroad Museum is located at Cedar and 3rd Streets in the old Rock Island depot.
 Chillicothe Historical Society Fourth St. Museum, 723 N. 4th St., features eight rooms of historic artifacts.
 Shore Acres Park, riverside park with 19th-century clubhouse formerly known as the Peoria Automobile Club.
 Three Sisters Park is an agricultural park that hosts Spider Hill and Summer Camp Music Festival.
 Town Theater, an art deco movie theater on N. 2nd St., is still in business showing films.

Notable people 

 Bill Krieg, Major League Baseball player
 Lance (Henry) LeGault, TV and movie actor: Colonel Roderick Decker on The A-Team
 Gene Maddox, Iowa state legislator and lawyer, was born in Chillicothe.
 Zach McAllister, Major League Baseball player, currently a pitcher in the St. Louis Cardinals organization
 Johnston McCulley, pulp author: created the Zorro stories upon which all later Zorro movies and books were based
 Josh Taylor, TV actor: Roman Brady on the soap opera Days of Our Lives

References 

 
Cities in Illinois
Cities in Peoria County, Illinois
Ronald Reagan Trail
Peoria metropolitan area, Illinois